San Fiz da Xesta is a village and parish in the region of Lalín, which is in the province of Pontevedra, Galicia. In 2011 the population was 252 residents (127 men and 125 women), which was a decrease from 1999 when it had 271 inhabitants.

The local church of Saint Fiz is the main attraction in the village.

Festivals

The patron saint of the parish is Saint Peter Fiz, which locals say “Festa por festa o Carme da Xesta" meaning that it is the best festival out of all the festivals around.

External links
The county of Lalín's page of A Xesta (in Galician)

Populated places in the Province of Pontevedra